Air Commodore K. Jaswant-Singh was an Indian air force personnel and served in the Ghana Air Force. He was the Chief of Air Staff of the Ghana Air Force from May 1959 to August 1960.

References

Ghanaian military personnel
Chiefs of Air Staff (Ghana)
Ghana Air Force personnel
Indian military personnel